Sikirevci is a village and municipality in Brod-Posavina County, Croatia. The municipality consists of two settlements: Sikirevci and Jaruge.

History
The name Sikrevci was first mentioned in 1540 as a river crossing ferry across the Sava river. The second mention of the name is also from the time of Ottoman rule in 1579 when it mentions the village of Sikirevci consisting of 31 houses with their respective properties. After the liberation from the Turks the village was re-established as a military (Grenzer) village. From the mid-18th century the village witnessed advanced urbanization and it became the seat of the 5th company (captaincy) of the Brod regiment. During the 'Canonical Visitation' in 1748, it was established that the village had 41 houses with 298 grown-ups and 100 children. Most of the population were soldiers (Grenzers) and/or common villagers.

From the census' in 1698, the native families of the village were: Jarić, Rakitić, Nikolić, Galović, Živić, Lučić, Marković, Benaković, Dimšić, and Dorić. From 1725, additional families settled in the village: were Bašlinović, Radovanović, Šarčević, Zečević, Bilokapić, Čivić, and Tursun.

The first mention of the Catholic parish of Sikirevci was mentioned in 1670, when Bishop Matej Belinić performed the Confirmation in the same parish. After the liberation from the Ottoman Empire the parish was added to the Velika Kopanica parish. The first brick-constructed church was built in 1776. Before that there was only a small chapel with a bell tower. The parish of Sikirevci was re-established again in 1789, and today's church was built in 1848.

The municipality of Sikirevci was first established as an administrative office in 1873, after abolishment and de-militarization of the Military Frontier. After the Croatian War of Independence the municipality was re-established by its extraction from the municipality of Slavonski Šamac.

Population
According to the 2001 census there are 2,707 inhabitants in the municipality living in two settlements:
Sikirevci 1,969
Jaruge 738

Ethnic composition
Croats 2,688
Serbs 7
Rusyns 1
others and unknown 11

References
 

Municipalities of Croatia
Populated places in Brod-Posavina County